Sahifat Dar al-Ulum (Arabic: صحيفة دار العلوم; DMG: Saḥīfat Dār-al-ʿUlūm; English: "The Journal of the House of Sciences") was an Arabic journal published in Cairo from 1934 to 1947. It was founded by Sayyid Qutb (1905-1966), a well-known Egyptian writer, poet, and critic, who is considered to be one of the Muslim Brotherhoodʼs most important thought leaders, as well as Saʿd al-Labban and Muhammad Ibrahim Jabr. After training as a teacher, Qutb graduated from the Dār al-ʿUlūm University in Cairo during the founding year of the journal.  In terms of content, the editors focused on the “latest pedagogical, social and linguistic theories”  and pursued the goal to compete with the reputation of al-Azhar and the Egyptian University through their intellectual Islamic orientation and their high demands on the students.  In addition to Saḥīfat Dār-al-ʿUlūm, Qutb also published his articles in other journals of various ideological orientations, including ar-Risala and aš-Šuʼūn al-iğtimāʿīya.

References

External links

1934 establishments in Egypt
1947 disestablishments in Egypt
Arabic-language magazines
Defunct magazines published in Egypt
Education magazines
Magazines disestablished in 1947
Magazines established in 1934
Magazines published in Cairo